Werner Schweizer (born 15 February 1916, date of death unknown) was a Swiss rower. He competed at the 1936 Summer Olympics in Berlin with the men's eight where they came sixth.

References

1916 births
Year of death missing
Olympic rowers of Switzerland
Rowers at the 1936 Summer Olympics
Swiss male rowers